UK Student Climate Network (UKSCN) is a student-led climate justice organisation operating in England and Wales founded by Anna Taylor, then aged 17, on 1 December 2018, along with Ivi Hohmann and Daniela Torres Perez.

UKSCN are a group of mainly under 18s who have been calling for strikes from school since February 2019, as part of the Youth Strike 4 Climate movement, with the ambition of getting the Government of the United Kingdom and the Welsh Government to take action on the climate crisis by fulfilling their demands. Their strikes have seen thousands of students across England and Wales, with Fridays For Future Scotland, and Youth Climate Association Northern Ireland organising youth climate strikes in Scotland, and Northern Ireland respectively, leave or not go to school on Fridays.

Demands
The network has four demands:

DEMAND 1-SAVE THE FUTURE
The Government is to declare a climate emergency and implement a Green New Deal to achieve Climate Justice.

DEMAND 2-TEACH THE FUTURE
The education system must be repurposed and reformed around the climate emergency to better teach young people about its urgency, severity, scientific basis and methods of mitigation. This demand has now evolved into the Teach the Future England campaign which is supported by the School Group Developmental working group as well as SOS-UK and various partner organisations.

DEMAND 3-TELL THE FUTURE
The Government communicate the severity of the ecological crisis and the necessity to act now to the general public.

DEMAND 4-EMPOWER THE FUTURE
Young people must be included in policy making, and no one should be excluded from participation in our democracy on the basis of age, citizenship, permanent address, incarceration or anything else. For as long as UK democracy is conducted through a representative system, everyone living in the UK over the age of 16 must have the right to vote in elections, conducted via proportional representation, so that everyone's vote is reflected in our government and is worth the same.

Structure
The organisation is divided into the regional groups of: South East, South West, Midlands, North East, North West, Wales and, as of July 2019, London. UKSCN is part of the Youth Strike 4 Climate movement in England and Wales. The rest of the UK is covered by separate organisations, in Scotland by Fridays For Future Scotland, in Northern Ireland by the Youth Climate Association Northern Ireland (YCANI). YCANI previously were affiliated with UKSCN, however, split away from the group due to cultural, legal and political differences between the two groups respective operating countries. FFF Scotland were asked to join UKSCN soon after the founding of both organisations, however, declined for similar reasons.

Isle of Man Student Climate Network are a separate group who organise strikes in the Isle of Man, a Crown Dependency of the United Kingdom. Isle of Man Student Climate Network coordinates with UKSCN, but are an independent organisation, founded in March 2019 by Ciara Sowerby, Archibald Elliott and Emily Thompson.

UKSCN does not directly organise strikes, they act as a support network for over 120 active local groups and strikes in over 300 locations around England and Wales. It has a national organising team that is split into several working groups that take part in campaigns and work with other movements. The number of volunteers assisting the group grew from around 30 in early March 2019 to an estimate of 300 by the end of April that year. In addition, it provides a platform for connection to around 350 youth strikers, whom are unaffiliated to the group specifically.

History

UKSCN's first strike was held on 15 February 2019, under the name YouthStrike4Climate. It saw 15,000 English and Welsh school students strike from schools in protest, with strikes in Scotland and Northern Ireland organised by different organisations.

This was followed by a second strike on 15 March 2019 which was coordinated with global Youth Strike 4 Climate protests that were held across the world, which saw 1.6 million students go on strike. The organisation's demonstrations have grown in popularity, with an estimated total of 20,000 people in attendance at the demonstration held outside Parliament Square in London on 15 March and 50,000 across England and Wales. The strikes are in solidarity with other Youth Strike 4 Climate protests taking place across the world.

Strikes have since taken place on:

 12 April 2019
 24 May 2019
 21 June 2019
 19 July 2019
 20 September 2019 which was a general strike of adults and students; this was the largest climate mobilisation in UK history with an estimated 100,000 people in London alone and an estimated 300,000 people at strikes across the UK.
 29 November 2019
 14 February 2020
 Digital strikes under lockdown

The only nationally coordinated strikes of 2020 were on 17 January and 14 February. Local group Bristol Youth Strike 4 Climate organised and held a strike on 28 February 2020 that was attended by over 30,000 people along with Greta Thunberg. Any further demonstrations were paused due to the COVID-19 pandemic; however, youth strikers have been engaging in online actions such as Fridays for Future Digital and Polluters Out's Twitter Storm.

References

External links
 Official website

2018 establishments in England
Environmental organisations based in London
Organizations established in 2018
Student organisations in the United Kingdom
Youth organisations based in London